Luca Verna (born 21 June 1993) is an Italian football player who plays as a midfielder for  club Catanzaro.

Career
He made his professional debut in the Lega Pro for Virtus Lanciano on 22 January 2012 in a game against Prato.

On 9 January 2019, he returned to Pisa from loan at Cosenza.

On 31 January 2020, he joined Ternana on loan with an option to buy.

On 17 September 2020 he signed a 2-year contract with Catanzaro.

References

External links
 
 

1993 births
Living people
People from Lanciano
Footballers from Abruzzo
Italian footballers
Association football midfielders
Serie B players
Serie C players
Lega Pro Seconda Divisione players
S.S. Virtus Lanciano 1924 players
A.C. ChievoVerona players
S.S. Chieti Calcio players
F.C. Grosseto S.S.D. players
Pisa S.C. players
A.C. Carpi players
Cosenza Calcio players
Ternana Calcio players
U.S. Catanzaro 1929 players
Sportspeople from the Province of Chieti